"Another Like My Lover" is an R&B song by American singer and actress Jasmine Guy. Released on January 20, 1991, The song is featured on Guy's self-titled debut album; which was released in October 1990. The single was a top ten hit on Billboard's Hot R&B Singles chart on April 6, 1991.

Charts

References

Jasmine Guy songs
1990 songs
1991 singles
Warner Records singles
Songs written by Timmy Gatling